The Elm Street House is a historic house on Elm Street in Bald Knob, Arkansas.  It is a single-story wood-frame structure, with an irregular plan that has intersecting gabled roof elements.  It is finished in weatherboard and rests on a brick foundation.  It has Craftsman features, including exposed rafter ends on the eaves and porch, and brick piers supporting the gabled front porch.  Built about 1925, it is one of White County's best preserved examples of Craftsman architecture.

The house was listed on the National Register of Historic Places in 1991.

See also
National Register of Historic Places listings in White County, Arkansas

References

Houses on the National Register of Historic Places in Arkansas
Houses completed in 1925
Houses in White County, Arkansas
National Register of Historic Places in White County, Arkansas
Buildings and structures in Bald Knob, Arkansas
1925 establishments in Arkansas
American Craftsman architecture in Arkansas
Bungalow architecture in Arkansas